The Shitouhe Dam is an embankment dam on the Shitouhe River, a tributary of the Weihe River which flows into the Yellow River, in Mei County of Shaanxi Province, China. The dam serves several purposes to include flood control, hydroelectric power and water supply for irrigation and municipal uses. Approved by China's Ministry of Water Conservancy in 1974, construction started in June 1976. It was completed in 1989. In July 1996, the dam began to supply water to the nearby city of Xi'an. In 2002 the Jinpen Dam to the east was constructed to help provide water to the city as well.

See also

List of dams and reservoirs in China
List of tallest dams in China

References

Dams in China
Rock-filled dams
Dams completed in 1989
Energy infrastructure completed in 1991
Hydroelectric power stations in Shaanxi
1989 establishments in China